Mohabbat Zindagi Hai is a popular song written for the Pakistani film Tum Salamat Raho.
The song was composed by Nashad. It had two versions, a male version by  ghazal singer, Mehdi Hassan, and female version by Noor Jehan. Lyrics were penned by Masroor Anwar.

Music video
Both the versions of the song were featured in movie. Both were picturised on Waheed Murad & Asiya.

The male version was shot in a garden and was featured first in the film. It begins with Asiya accepting her love for Waheed and Waheed promising not to deceive her love. Then Waheed sings the song whilst romancing Asiya. It ends with them walking away united.

The female version was featured later in the movie and was shot in a mountain valley. It begins with Asiya promising to Waheed that she will marry only him and she is only his. Then she sings the song whilst romancing Waheed. It ends with Mohammad Ali catching them red-handed, romancing.

Reception
The song, especially the male version, became a rage and is recognised as a classic today. It is also considered one of the best songs sung by Mehdi Hassan.

Pakistani songs
Songs written for films